Parent company: China Datang Corporation

Datang International Power Generation Company Limited, simply Datang International Power or Datang Power, is one of the five largest state-owned power producers in China, especially its position in Northern China. It is engaged in the development and operation of power plants, the sale of electricity and thermal power, and the repair and maintenance of power equipment and power-related technical services.

Datang Power owns four operating power plants and managed 17 power companies, with total installed capacity amounted to 15,410 megawatts (MW) at the end of  mid-2006.

Datang Power was incorporated on 13 December 1994. The state-owned enterprise has been listed on the Hong Kong Stock Exchange and London Stock Exchange since 21 March 1997.

See also

State Electricity Regulatory Commission (SERC)

References

External links
Datang International Power Generation Company

Electric power companies of China
Government-owned companies of China
Companies based in Beijing
Energy companies established in 1994
Companies listed on the Hong Kong Stock Exchange
Companies listed on the Shanghai Stock Exchange
H shares
Chinese companies established in 1994